Otto Woffek was a Czech tennis player. He competed in the men's singles and doubles events at the 1920 Summer Olympics.

References

External links
 

Year of birth missing
Year of death missing
Czech male tennis players
Olympic tennis players of Czechoslovakia
Tennis players at the 1920 Summer Olympics
Place of birth missing